James Riley Stone  (2 August 1908 – 24 November 2005) was a Canadian soldier and military commander.

Born in Winterbourne, Gloucestershire, he enlisted in the Edmonton Regiment in 1939 and fought in the Second World War, rising from the rank of private to lieutenant colonel. Stone won the Military Cross at the Battle of Ortona in Italy in 1943, when he assaulted a German anti-tank gun that was blocking his company's advance and silenced it with a grenade.

As his regiment's commanding officer, he won the Distinguished Service Order at the Battle of San Fortunato in Italy in 1944, where his actions hauling heavy guns up a steep mountain caused the German Gothic Line to withdraw from a strategic position. He was awarded a bar to his DSO in the Netherlands for actions against well-entrenched German forces in March 1945.

After returning to British Columbia during the post-war years, he commanded the Rocky Mountain Rangers, a unit of the Canadian Army Reserve. 

During the Korean War, he commanded the 2nd Battalion, Princess Patricia's Canadian Light Infantry. He led the 700 men of this battalion in defence of the strategic Hill 677 against the fierce assault by a full division of about 20,000 soldiers of the Chinese People's Volunteer Army during the Battle of Kapyong in April 1951. The UN position on Hill 677 prevented the enemy from breaking through to Seoul and potentially surrounding the U.S. forces in Korea. He received a second bar to his DSO for his leadership in this famous battle together with other actions in 1951. 

After the war, while serving in Ottawa as the provost marshal in command of the Canadian Provost Corps, he founded the Military Police Fund for Blind Children. He was made a Member of the Order of Canada in 1994.

In December 2016, the Government of South Korea's Ministry of Patriots and Veterans Affairs designated Stone posthumously as an official Korean War Hero. The citation stated that the 2 PPCLI battalion had "achieved a milestone victory when they won the Battle of Gapyeong (Kapyong) against formidable attacks from Chinese troops" and that "with their victory in the Battle of Gapyeong (Kapyong), Stone and his soldiers are remembered as the Legends of Gapyeong to this day."

Honours and awards

References

External links
Commanding officer talks about Canada’s first battles in Korea
The legacy of Col. James Riley Stone

1908 births
2005 deaths
Military personnel from Gloucestershire
People from Winterbourne, Gloucestershire
Princess Patricia's Canadian Light Infantry officers
Canadian Army personnel of World War II
Canadian military personnel of the Korean War
Loyal Edmonton Regiment soldiers
Rocky Mountain Rangers
British emigrants to Canada